Route 125 is a Quebec highway running from Montreal (on Pie-IX Boulevard near the Olympic Stadium) to Saint-Donat, Lanaudière, Quebec in the Lanaudière. The southern section of Route 125 runs parallel to Autoroute 25 in Laval, Mascouche, and Terrebonne. At Saint-Esprit, the Autoroute ends, and 125 continues northwards until the entrance to the Mont Tremblant Provincial Park north of Saint-Donat.

Major intersections

See also
List of Quebec provincial highways
 Pie IX Bridge
 Sophie Masson Bridge

References

External links 
 Provincial Route Map (Courtesy of the Quebec Ministry of Transportation) 

125
Roads in Laval, Quebec
Roads in Montreal
Transport in Mascouche
Transport in Terrebonne, Quebec